The Platinum Collection (Sounds of Summer Edition) is a three-disc greatest hits album by American rock band The Beach Boys, released in December 2005 by EMI. It includes some of The Beach Boys' most popular songs from their early days like "California Girls" and "Surfin' U.S.A.", but also songs from their later period, when their success started to fade, like "Lady Lynda" or "Sumahama". Except for some songs from the first two albums, most previously mono tracks have been digitally remastered in stereo.

Track listing

References

2005 greatest hits albums
The Beach Boys compilation albums
EMI Records compilation albums